The 2009 Guzzini Challenger was a professional tennis tournament played on Hard courts. This was the sixth edition of the tournament which is part of the 2009 ATP Challenger Tour. It took place in Recanati, Italy between 20 July and 26 July 2009.

ATP entrants

Seeds

 Rankings are as of July 13, 2009.

Other entrants
The following players received wildcards into the singles main draw:
  Daniele Bracciali
  Giacomo Miccini
  Federico Torresi

The following player received special exempt into the main draw:
  Thomaz Bellucci
  Igor Sijsling

The following players received entry from the qualifying draw:
  George Bastl (as a Lucky Loser)
  Rabie Chaki
  Federico del Bonis (as a Lucky Loser)
  Jean-Noel Insausti
  Gianluca Naso
  Louk Sorensen

Champions

Singles

 Stéphane Bohli def.  Andrey Golubev, 6–4, 7–6(4)

Doubles

 Frederik Nielsen /  Joseph Sirianni def.  Adriano Biasella /  Andrey Golubev, 6–4, 3–6, [10–6]

External links
Official Site
2009 Draws

Guzzini Challenger
Guzzini Challenger
2009 in Italian tennis